Kaskan Qajaq (also Romanized as Kasḵan Qajaq; also known as Kasgenqojoq) is a village in Aqabad Rural District, in the Central District of Gonbad-e Qabus County, Golestan Province, Iran. At the 2006 census, its population was 991, in 182 families.

References 

Populated places in Gonbad-e Kavus County